Sorghum arundinaceum, the common wild sorghum, is a species of flowering plant in the family Poaceae. It is native to SubSaharan Africa, Madagascar, many of the Indian Ocean islands, and the Indian Subcontinent, and has been introduced to northern South America, the US states of California and Florida, Puerto Rico, Taiwan, New Guinea, and a number of smaller islands worldwide. It is the wild progenitor of cultivated sorghum, Sorghum bicolor, with some authorities considering it to be a mere variety or subspecies; Sorghum bicolor var. arundinaceum, or Sorghum bicolor subsp. verticilliflorum.

References

arundinaceum
Forages
Flora of West Tropical Africa
Flora of West-Central Tropical Africa
Flora of Northeast Tropical Africa
Flora of East Tropical Africa
Flora of South Tropical Africa
Flora of Southern Africa
Flora of the Western Indian Ocean
Flora of India (region)
Flora of West Himalaya
Flora of East Himalaya
Plants described in 1917